Rivière aux Pins may refer to:

 Rivière aux Pins (Montmorency River tributary), tributary of the Montmorency River in Sainte-Brigitte-de-Laval, La Jacques Cartier Regional County Municipality, Capitale-Nationale, Quebec, Canada
 Rivière aux Pins (Saint-Joseph Lake), tributary of Saint-Joseph Lake in Fossambault-sur-le-Lac, La Jacques Cartier Regional County Municipality, Capitale-Nationale, Quebec Canada
 Petite rivière aux Pins, tributary of Rivière aux Pins in La Jacques-Cartier Regional County Municipality, Capitale-Nationale, Quebec, Canada
 Rivière aux Pins (Beaurivage River), tributary of Beaurivage River in Lotbinière Regional County Municipality, Chaudière-Appalaches, Quebec, Canada
 Rivière aux Pins (Boucherville), a tributary of the south shore of the Saint Lawrence River in Boucherville, Montérégie, Quebec, Canada

See also
 Rivière au Pin (Bécancour River tributary)
Rivière des Pins (disambiguation)
Pine River (disambiguation)